Wandlitz is a municipality in the district of Barnim, in Brandenburg, Germany. It is situated 25 km north of Berlin, and 15 km east of Oranienburg. The municipality was established in 2004 by merger of the nine villages Basdorf, Klosterfelde, Lanke, Prenden, Schönerlinde, Wandlitz and Zerpenschleuse.

The communal government of the Great municipality has its seat in Wandlitz directly. It consists of deputies from the several parts of the commune and in accordance with the election results of the existing parties here.

Demography
The post-war influx of refugees from eastern regions led to a rise in the population. The population growth stagnated during the communist era. After the fall of the Berlin Wall, the population began a rising tendency again.

Sightseeing
 Wandlitzsee lake
 The nearby lake of Liepnitzsee
 The Agricultural Museum in Wandlitz-old village (Barnim Panorama)
 The Steam Railway Museum in Basdorf (Heidekrautbahn-Museum)
 The International Museum of Circus Performers in Klosterfelde (Internationales Artistenmuseum)
 Several old churches
 Beautiful lakes in the surrounding area such as Wandlitzsee, Liepnitzsee, Bogensee, Rahmersee, Stolzenhagener See
 In the woods North East of the village Wandlitz is the small Bogensee with a former summer house of Joseph Goebbels, later part of the academy of the Free German Youth organization. Today the area belongs to the Berlin state forests and the buildings are to let.

Culture
 Goldener Löwe Kulturbühne: regular concerts, cabaret, opera, poetry readings, and comedy events.
 Studio of stained glass artist Annelie Grund
 Studio of  Biomech tattoo Artist Markus Lenhard also known as Lux Altera

Sport & Leisure
 Windsurfing school and board hire on Wandlitzsee lake
 public beach and bathing area on Wandlitzsee
 Horse-riding
 27-hole golf-course at nearby Prenden

Twin towns
 La Ferrière, Vendée, France
 Trzebiatów, Poland
 Gladbeck, North Rhine-Westphalia
 Schwechat, Austria
 London Borough of Enfield, Great Britain
 Alanya, Turkey
 Fushun, China

History 
Wandlitz was first mentioned as Slavic Vandlice in a 1242 deed, when the Margraves of Brandenburg John I and Otto III sold it to the Lehnin Abbey. The word means men who live at the water. Situated on the Barnim plateau among woods and lakes it became a popular recreation area especially in the 20th century. Since 1901 the Heidekrautbahn railway line links Wandlitz with Berlin.

 Development

The name Wandlitz was and is also often used as a synonym for the nearby "Waldsiedlung" compound, where the highest East German functionaries lived removed from the general population. But this settlement is a part of the town Bernau.

Shortly after World War II, the village was home to an orphanage of children from Berlin.  The orphanage, run by nuns, later became a holiday spot for visiting high-ranking Communist party members.  The children of the small orphanage were frowned upon as second-class citizens by villagers, and often went hungry.

Pictures from Towns and Villages in Gemeinde Wandlitz

Transport

Wandlitz is situated at the junction of the Bundesstraße 109 to Berlin and the Bundesautobahn 10 (Berliner Ring) with the Bundesstraße 273 leading from Oranienburg to the Bundesautobahn 11. The NEB Heidekrautbahn links Wandlitz with the Berlin-Karow railway station on the Berlin S2 S-Bahn line. Wandlitz is known to be the home of the only existing Skoda Fabia that still uses a steam power engine. Alleged owner is Ernest B ("IM Siggi").

References

External links

 Heidekrautmuseum Basdorf
 Internationales Artisetenmuseum Klosterfelde
 Agrarmuseum Wandlitz
 Goldener Löwe
 Niederbarnimer Eisenbahn - NEB Heidekrautbahn railway
 Prenden Golf Course

Localities in Barnim